The Girl from Nowhere may refer to:

The Girl from Nowhere (1919 film), a 1919 American silent film
The Girl from Nowhere (1921 film), a 1921 American silent film
The Girl from Nowhere (2012 film), a 2012 French film

See also
 Girl from Nowhere, a Thai television series